The 50 Greatest Jewish Movies: A Critic's Ranking of the Very Best was a 1998 book published by Kathryn Bernheimer. Bernheimer ranked the "top 50" films dealing with Jewish topics.

The top three films were, in descending order, The Chosen, Schindler's List, and Shoah.

References

Bernheimer, Kathryn. The 50 Greatest Jewish Movies: A Critic's Ranking of the Very Best. Secaucus, NJ: Carol, 1998.

Further reading
Review of The 50 Greatest Jewish Movies.

External links
Almonds and Raisins, the documentary about Yiddish cinema from 1927-1940 featured on this list, at IMDb
Davidoff on Bernheimer, 'The 50 Greatest Jewish Movies: A Critic's Ranking of the Very Best'|H-Film|H-Net

 
 
Books about film
1998 books
Books about Jews and Judaism